George Altman (born 1933) is a baseball player.

George or Georges Altman may also refer to:

George Altman, a character in Suburgatory
Georges Altman (1901–1960), French journalist and resistance fighter